Justin Thomas William Sisely is an Australian filmmaker, known for his documentary Virgins Wanted, in which the camera follows the story of a Brazilian woman and Australian man who auction off their virginity.

See also
Virginity auction

References

Year of birth missing (living people)
Living people
Australian filmmakers